Ariyana Gostar Kish Football Club is an Iranian football club based in Kish, Iran.

The club was established in 2009.  They competed in the 2009–10 Iran Football's 3rd Division. They reached the Second Round, where they were placed in the 2nd/Group C, and finally they were promoted for the 2010–11 Iran Football's 2nd Division.

They competed in the 2010–11 Iran Football's 2nd Division. In 2011, the license of the club in 2nd Division League was bought by Badr Hormozgan.

Season-by-Season

The table below shows the achievements of the club in various competitions.

See also
 Hazfi Cup
 Iran Football's 2nd Division 2010–11

References

External links
 قرعه كشى مسابقات ليگ دسته دوم باشگاه هاى كشور Iranian News site 

Football clubs in Iran
Association football clubs established in 2009
2009 establishments in Iran